Von Gunten is a surname meaning “from the town of Gunten,” from Gunten, Switzerland. 

Notable people with the surname include:

Ernst von Gunten (born 1921), Swiss sprinter
Patrick von Gunten (born 1985), Swiss ice hockey player
Peter von Gunten (born 1941), Swiss film director

See also
Jakob von Gunten, Swiss novel